A shearer is someone who shears, such as a cloth shearer, or a sheep shearer.
Origins of the name include from near Bergen in Norway 1600s [Sweden of that period] as Skea (pronounced "Skeg" meaning "beard") and Heddle (meaning market place) as migrated to The Orkney Islands where the name 'Shearer' is found in Church marriage records of the time and as quite prolific for the overall population.  Members of those family Shearer migrated to Australia and New Zealand in the 19th century and represents the highest concentration of nation for the name globally

Additionally, Shearers are some kind of mining machines used for continuous mining

Additionally, Shearer is a surname:

In sports

Alan Shearer (born 1970), English footballer
Bob Shearer (born 1948), Australian professional golfer and golf course architect
Bobby Shearer (1931–2006), Scottish footballer
Brad Shearer (born 1955), Gridiron stalwart
Dale Shearer (born 1965), Australian rugby league player
Dave Shearer (born 1958), Scottish footballer
Duncan Shearer (born 1962), Scottish footballer
Jack Shearer (born 1896), New Zealand Rugby union player
Rob Shearer (born 1976), Canadian ice hockey player
Sam Shearer (born 1883), Scottish footballer
Scott Shearer (born 1981), Scottish footballer.
Sydney Shearer (born 1890), New Zealand Rugby union player

In politics and religion

David Shearer (born 1957), New Zealand Leader of the Opposition and UN Deputy Special Representative to Iraq
David Shearer (minister) (1832–1891), founder of the Presbyterian Church in Western Australia
Hugh Shearer (1923–2004), Jamaican Prime Minister
Ian Shearer (1941–2021), New Zealand, National Party politician
Jack Shearer (priest) (1926–2001), Church of Ireland priest and Dean of Belfast cathedral
Robert Austin Shearer (1868–1920), Ontario farmer and political figure
Vernon Shearer, South African politician

In the arts
Aaron Shearer (1919–2008), American classical guitarist and teacher
Allen Shearer (born 1943), American composer and baritone
Ariel Shearer (born c. 1905), Australian concert pianist
Athole Shearer (1900–1985), Canadian actress
Ben Shearer (born 1941), South Australian artist noted for outback watercolours
Christopher Shearer (1846–1926), American landscape artist
Harry Shearer (born 1943), American actor and comedian
John D. Shearer (born 1980), American photographer
Moira Shearer (1926–2006), Scottish actress and ballet dancer 
Norma Shearer (1902–1983), Canadian-American actress, sister of Athole
Sybil Shearer (1912–2005), a Canadian modern dancer, writer, choreographer

Others

David Shearer (engineer) (1850–1936), inventor and agricultural implement manufacturer and steam car pioneer
Douglas Shearer, Canadian-American motion picture sound engineer
Ernest Shearer (1879–1945) Scottish agriculturalist
Jesse Lowen Shearer, American engineer
John Shearer (engineer) (1845–1932), inventor and agricultural implement manufacturer

See also
 Other surnames:
 Scherer
 Sheerer
 Sharer
Shear (disambiguation)

Surnames of Lowland Scottish origin
Occupational surnames
English-language occupational surnames